Mahlon Street Tisdale (December 6, 1890 – July 12, 1972) was an officer of the United States Navy. He was awarded two Navy Crosses, one for staff service in World War I, and another during the Battle of Tassafaronga in World War II.

Early life and education
Tisdale was born on December 6, 1890 in Wenona, Illinois. He was appointed to the United States Naval Academy in 1908 and graduated with a commission as an Ensign in the United States Navy on 7 June 1912. Aboard USS Salem, Tisdale participated in the Veracruz Expedition in 1914.

For this service, Tisdale received a Navy Cross.

In January 1921, he was transfer to the staff of the Commander, Battleship Division Six, Pacific Fleet, where he served aboard  as division radio officer.

In June 1921, Tisdale was transferred to the Naval Academy, where he became a superintendent.

Career
Tisdale's career including surface command, various staff positions, and Commander, Destroyers, Pacific Fleet (ComDesPac) during World War II. He was also Commandant of Midshipmen at the United States Naval Academy at the start of World War II. For his actions, Tisdale was awarded a star to his existing Navy Cross.

Awards and decorations

Legacy 

The Oliver Hazard Perry class guided missile frigate  was named in his honor.

References

External links 
 US Navy Biography

1890 births
1972 deaths
United States Navy personnel of World War I
United States Navy World War II admirals
United States Navy admirals
United States Naval Academy alumni
Recipients of the Navy Cross (United States)
Recipients of the Navy Distinguished Service Medal
Recipients of the Legion of Merit